Gienek Loska or Henadzi Loska (8 January 1975 – 9 September 2020) was a Polish singer-songwriter and guitarist born in Byelaazyorsk in Belarus who rose to fame after winning the first series of X Factor in 2011. Since his arrival to Poland in early 1990s, he lived in Białystok, Kraków and from 2004 in Wrocław, Poland.

Loska was the co-founder and longtime member of the blues-rock band Seven B. He was a leading singer and guitarist of Gienek Loska Band. He was also known to the public due to his repeated performances on streets of bigger Polish cities. In 2009 he was invited to make a record with Alek Mrozek, a known Polish composer.

He took part in several TV talent shows:

 Szansa na sukces – in 2004, with the band Wilki
 Mam talent – the third series
 X Factor Poland – the first series – in 2011, the winner of main prize

Seven B
In 1990 in Grodno he founded a band called Seven B together with Andrei Makarewicz Makarem. Upon arrival to Poland in 1992, the group toured in Augustów, Białystok and in 1993 came to Kraków where they played together until 2005. They toured usually as a quintet. Together, they recorded three albums Rocktales, Make up your mind, and Acoustic. In 2006, the group disbanded, leading to the creation of a far more successful Gienek Loska Band.

Discography 
 Lepiej niż wczoraj (with Alek Mrożek), CD released 9 October 2009 by B&J Music.
 Hazardzista, CD released 21 November 2011 by Sony Music Entertainment Poland, digital download. Sales: 15,000 plus. Certification: Gold.
 Dom, CD released 16 April 2013 by Sony Music Entertainment Poland, digital download.

References

External links
 

1975 births
2020 deaths
The X Factor winners
Polish singer-songwriters
Polish male guitarists
Polish blues singers
Polish rock singers
Belarusian musicians
Belarusian emigrants to Poland
People from Byaroza District
Polish lyricists
20th-century Polish male singers
21st-century Polish male singers
21st-century Polish singers
21st-century guitarists